The Window is an album by Steve Lacy which was released on the Italian Soul Note label in 1988 and features six of Lacy's compositions, one featuring text by the poet Mary Frazee, performed by Lacy, Jean-Jacques Avenel and Oliver Johnson.

Reception
The Allmusic review awarded the album 4½ stars.

Track listing
1 The Window - 8:02

2 Flakes - 7:00

3 Twilight - 9:14

4 The Gleam - 8:23

5 A Complicated Scene - (Mary Frazee, Steve Lacy) - 8:48

6 Retreat - 7:04

All compositions by Steve Lacy except as indicated
Recorded July 30–31, 1987 at Barigozzi Studios, Milan

Personnel
Steve Lacy - soprano saxophone
Jean-Jacques Avenel - bass
Oliver Johnson - drums

References 
https://www.allmusic.com/album/the-window-mw0000652963

1988 albums
Steve Lacy (saxophonist) albums
Black Saint/Soul Note albums